Gongromastix is a genus of midges in the family Cecidomyiidae. The five described species in this genus are known from the holarctic and oriental regions. It was established by Günther Enderlein in 1936.

Species
Gongromastix angustipennis (Strobl, 1902)
Gongromastix elongata (Felt, 1908)
Gongromastix ignigena Jaschhof, 2002
Gongromastix indica (Rao & Adwant, 1975)
Gongromastix orientalis (Rao & Adwant, 1975)

References

Cecidomyiidae genera
Insects described in 1936
Taxa named by Günther Enderlein